The Aouk-Aoukale Faunal Reserve is a national park found in the Central African Republic. It was established in 1939. This site is 3451 km².

References

Protected areas of the Central African Republic
Faunal reserves
Protected areas established in 1939
1939 establishments in Ubangi-Shari